The New Zealand national youth handball team is the national under 19 men's handball team of New Zealand and is controlled by the New Zealand Handball Federation.

Results

Youth Olympic Games record

World Championship record

Oceania Nations Cup record

IHF Inter-Continental Trophy

References

External links
Official website
IHF profile

Handball in New Zealand
Men's national youth handball teams
Handball